The 1968-69 FIBA Women's European Champions Cup was the tenth edition of the competition. Daugava Riga defeated Chemie Halle to win its sixth trophy in a row. This was the only appearance of an East German team in the competition's final. 1968 runner-up Sparta Prague withdrew from the 6-team Group stage, refusing to play against Akademik Sofia.

Qualifying round

Round of 12

Group stage

Group A

Group B

Semifinals

Final

References

Champions Cup
European
European
EuroLeague Women seasons